Interstate 90/94 exists as a concurrency as:

 Dan Ryan Expressway, a freeway in Chicago that runs from the Circle Interchange with Interstate 290 near Downtown Chicago through the South Side of the city
 Kennedy Expressway, a freeway in metropolitan Chicago, Illinois that travels northwest from the neighborhood of West Loop to O'Hare International Airport

Interstate 90
Interstate 94